|}

The Dick Hern Fillies' Stakes is a Listed flat horse race in Great Britain open to fillies and mares aged three years or older. It is run at Haydock Park over a distance of 1 mile and 37 yards (1,643 metres), and it is scheduled to take place each year in August.

The race is named after Dick Hern (1921 - 2002), an English racehorse trainer. 
The race was first run in 1999 and was awarded Listed status in 2002.  Prior to 2011 it was run at Bath Racecourse.

Records
Most successful horse:
 no horse has won this race more than once

Leading jockey (3 wins):
 Jamie Spencer – Full Flow (2000), Alasha (2002), Annabelle's Charm (2009)
 Andrea Atzeni  Aljazzi (2016), Sea Of Grace (2017), Rising Star (2022) 

Leading trainer (3 wins):
William Haggas – Token Of Love (2014), Sea Of Grace (2017), Miss O Connor (2019)

Winners

See also
 Horse racing in Great Britain
 List of British flat horse races

References
 Racing Post:
 , 

Flat races in Great Britain
Haydock Park Racecourse
Mile category horse races for fillies and mares
Recurring sporting events established in 1999
1999 establishments in England